The 2001 FIA GT Nürburgring 500 km was the ninth round the 2001 FIA GT Championship season.  It took place at the Nürburgring, Germany, on September 9, 2001.

Official results
Class winners in bold.  Cars failing to complete 70% of winner's distance marked as Not Classified (NC).

Statistics
 Pole position – #15 Prodrive All-Stars – 1:39.651
 Fastest lap – #2 Lister Storm Racing – 1:40.252
 Average speed – 147.040 km/h

References

 
 
 

N
FIA GT